Chinese H-alpha Solar Explorer (CHASE), also named Xihe after the solar deity, is China's first solar observatory. It was launched aboard a Long March 2D rocket on 14 October 2021. CHASE is a  satellite operating at a 517-kilometer-altitude sun-synchronous orbit, with an orbital period of around 94 minutes.

See also 
 Xuntian

Notes 

Chinese telescopes
Satellites of China
Spacecraft launched in 2021
Space telescopes